Svetozar Botorić (1857–1916) was a Serbian entrepreneur and film producer. He was the owner of Serbia's first movie theatre, the Paris Cinema, located inside the eponymous Hotel Paris, at Belgrade's Terazije Square, which opened in December 1908. Unlike many of his contemporaries, Botorić was convinced that film could be turned into a profitable endeavour. In 1909, he signed a contract with the French cinematographic firm Pathé, becoming their representative in Serbia and Bulgaria. In this capacity, he held exclusive Balkan premieres of Pathé's films in his hotel. Botorić also regularly produced newsreels about local events on Pathé's behalf, with the firm providing filming equipment and a cameraman (Louis de Beéry), and Botorić giving them a share of his admission profits. In 1911, Botorić teamed up with the prominent stage actor Ilija Stanojević to establish the Union for the Production of Serbian Films.

In 1911, Botorić produced The Life and Deeds of the Immortal Leader Karađorđe, often referred to simply as Karađorđe, Serbia's first feature film. The film was successful domestically, but failed to find a distributor abroad. The same fate befell Botorić's other productions. After several further unsuccessful attempts at getting international distribution for his films, Botorić left the film industry altogether. Commercial film production came to a virtual halt following the outbreak of World War I. During the Austro-Hungarian, German and Bulgarian invasion of Serbia in late 1915, Botorić was taken prisoner, and died in an Austro-Hungarian internment camp the following year. Karađorđe was considered lost for much of the 20th century, but was rediscovered in Vienna in July 2003.

References

Bibliography

1857 births
1916 deaths
Film people from Belgrade
Businesspeople from Belgrade